Cyclooctadiene rhodium chloride dimer is the organorhodium compound with the formula Rh2Cl2(C8H12)2, commonly abbreviated [RhCl(COD)]2 or Rh2Cl2(COD)2.  This yellow-orange, air-stable compound is a widely used precursor to homogeneous catalysts.

Preparation and reactions
The synthesis of [RhCl(COD)]2 involves heating a solution of hydrated rhodium trichloride with 1,5-cyclooctadiene in aqueous ethanol in the presence of sodium carbonate:
2 RhCl3·3H2O + 2 COD + 2 CH3CH2OH + 2 Na2CO3 → [RhCl(COD)]2 + 2 CH3CHO + 8 H2O + 2 CO2 + 4 NaCl

[RhCl(COD)]2 is principally used as a source of the electrophile "[Rh(COD)]+."
[RhCl(COD)]2 + L → [LRh(COD)]+Cl− (where L = PR3, alkene, etc. and  = 2 or 3)
In this way, chiral phosphines can be attached to Rh. The resulting chiral complexes are capable of asymmetric hydrogenation.  A related but still more reactive complex is chlorobis(cyclooctene)rhodium dimer. The dimer reacts with a variety of Lewis bases (L) to form adducts with the stoichiometry RhCl(L)(COD).

Structure
The molecule consists of a pair of square planar Rh centers bound to a 1,5-cyclooctadiene and two chloride ligands that are shared between the Rh centers. The Rh2Cl2 core is also approximately planar, in contrast to the highly bent structure of cyclooctadiene iridium chloride dimer where the dihedral angle is 86°.

References

External links

Organorhodium compounds
Homogeneous catalysis
Cyclooctadiene complexes
Dimers (chemistry)
Chloro complexes
Rhodium(I) compounds